North Tivoli is a suburb of Ipswich in the City of Ipswich, Queensland, Australia.

Geography 
The northern boundary of North Tivoli follows the Warrego Highway.  The Bremer River marks the southern border. Most of the suburb is used for industrial purposes; the eastern half of the suburb is occupied by a single business, producing blended landscaping soils and compost.

History 

Education 
There are no schools in North Tivoli. The nearest primary school is Tivoli State School in Tivoli. The nearest secondary school is Ipswich State High School in Brassall.

References

Suburbs of Ipswich, Queensland